William Frederick Oliver Faviell (5 June 1882 – 4 February 1950) was a British Army officer and cricketer who played for Essex between 1903 and 1910.

Military career
Faviell was commissioned into the 3rd (Militia) Battalion of the East Surrey Regiment in November 1900. He received a commission in the regular army as a second lieutenant in the Worcestershire Regiment on 30 April 1902, and was stationed with his battalion in Orange River Colony to secure the peace after the end of the Second Boer War in June 1902. He left Cape Town for the United Kingdom four months later, on the SS Orient which arrived at Southampton in November 1902.

References

External links

1882 births
1950 deaths
English cricketers
Essex cricketers
People from Loughton
Europeans cricketers
British Army personnel of the Second Boer War
East Surrey Regiment officers
Worcestershire Regiment officers